This is a list of Zimbabwean Test cricketers.

A Test match is an international cricket match between two representative teams that are full members of the International Cricket Council (ICC). Both teams have two innings, and the match lasts up to five days.

The list is arranged in the order in which each player won his first Test cap. Where more than one player won his first Test cap in the same match, those players are listed alphabetically by surname.

Statistics are correct as of 14 February 2023.

Note:

See also 
 Test cricket
 Zimbabwe national cricket team
 List of Zimbabwe ODI cricketers
 List of Zimbabwe Twenty20 International cricketers

References

External links 
 Cricinfo
 Howstat

Test
Zimbabwe